Paul Swift is a British driver known for stunt driving, autotesting, precision driving, and his involvement in live-action arena shows and motor shows including the UK Motorshow and Top Gear Live.

Career

Swift started his stunt driving career at age was tanim seven, when he learned to drive his family’s ride-on-lawn-mower on two wheels. Within three months of practicing, he set a world record performing the stunt over a distance of 230m. His first-ever precision driving show was as part of his father's display team (Russ Swift) in a Miniature Rover Montego at the British Grand Prix at Silverstone. At age 16, Swift began competing in auto testing with both Durham and Hartlepool motor clubs. After winning the regional championship in 1998, he moved up to the national championship. He ultimately won seven national titles, winning over 40 national events outright, as well as representing England on many occasions.

In 2006, Swift became the first Englishman ever to win a round of the Northern Irish Autotest Championship outright, in a borrowed Mini Special. The following season, after winning his seventh British Championship, Swift announced his retirement from auto testing and left his job as a mechanical engineer to concentrate fully on stunt driving.

Appearances

Swift has over 30 years of stunt experience and employs a team of precision drivers. Swift has appeared on BBC's Top Gear television on a number of occasions, and led the Top Gear Live stunt team for seven years. He has appeared on television programs including Britain’s Got Talent, Emmerdale, Fifth Gear, and Guinness World Records Smashed.

References

External links
 www.stuntdriving.co.uk

British stunt performers
Living people
1979 births
Sportspeople from Darlington
English rally drivers